Arrenuridae is a family of prostigs in the order Trombidiformes. There are at least 3 genera and 110 described species in Arrenuridae.

Genera
 Arrenurus Dugès, 1834
 Laversia Cook, 1955
 Micruracaropsis Viets, 1939

References

Further reading

 
 
 
 

 
Trombidiformes
Acari families